The year 1787 in science and technology involved some significant events.

Astronomy
 January 11 – William Herschel discovers Titania and Oberon, the first moons of Uranus found.
 February 19 – First light for William Herschel's 40-foot telescope under construction at Observatory House, Slough, England.
 Caroline Herschel is granted an annual salary of £50 by King George III of Great Britain for acting as assistant to her brother William in astronomy.

Biology
 William Curtis begins publication of The Botanical Magazine; or Flower-Garden Displayed in London. As Curtis's Botanical Magazine, it will still be published into the 21st century.
 Spanish physician Francisco Xavier Cid publishes Tarantismo Observado en España, a study of tarantulas and the tarantella as a cure for their bite.
 King George III of Great Britain, writing as Ralph Robinson of Windsor, contributes to Arthur Young's Annals of Agriculture.

Chemistry
 Guyton de Morveau, Jean-Henri Hassenfratz, Antoine François, Antoine Lavoisier, Pierre Adet and Claude Berthollet publish Méthode de nomenclature chimique in Paris.
 Jacques Charles proposes Charles's law, a corollary of Boyle's law, describes relationship between temperature and volume of a gas.

Physics
 Ernst Chladni publishes Entdeckungen über die Theorie des Klanges, demonstrating modes of vibration.
 Jean-Paul Marat publishes the first French translation of Newton's 'Opticks'

Surveying
 The first great theodolite constructed by Jesse Ramsden for the Anglo-French Survey (1784–1790) linking the observatories of Paris and Greenwich.

Technology
 June – William Symington patents improvements to the Watt steam engine.
 c. July – John Wilkinson launches an iron barge in the English Midlands.
 August 27 – Launching a  steam-powered craft on the Delaware River, John Fitch demonstrates the first United States patent for his design.
 December 3 – James Rumsey demonstrates a water-jet propelled boat on the Potomac.
 First production of all-iron edge rail (for underground colliery rail transport), at Plymouth Ironworks, Merthyr Tydfil, South Wales.
 First introduction of a plateway, underground at Sheffield Park Colliery, Yorkshire, England, by John Curr.
 William Chapman designs a segmental skew arch at Finlay Bridge, Naas, on the Kildare Canal in Ireland.
 Levi Hutchins of New Hampshire produces a mechanical alarm clock.

Awards
 Copley Medal: John Hunter

Births
 January 24 – Christophe-Paulin de La Poix de Fréminville (died 1848), French explorer and naturalist.
 March 6 – Joseph von Fraunhofer (died 1826), Bavarian physicist.
 March 8 – Karl Ferdinand von Graefe (died 1840), Polish-born German surgeon.
 March 9 - Josephine Kablick (died 1863), Czech botanist and paleontologist. 
 March 28 – Claudius James Rich (died 1821), British archaeologist and anthropologist.
 March 29 – Carl Philipp Sprengel (died 1859), German botanist.
 April 24 – Mathieu Orfila (died 1853), Spanish-born French physician and chemist.
 May 27 – Benjamin Valz (died 1867), French astronomer.
 June 2 – Nils Gabriel Sefström (died 1845), Swedish chemist and mineralogist.
 June 3 – Auguste Le Prévost (died 1859), French geologist, philologist, archaeologist and historian.
 June 4 – Constant Prévost (died 1856), French geologist.
 June 7 – William Conybeare (died 1857), English geologist.
 June 27 – Thomas Say (died 1834), American naturalist.
 August 16 – Jean Michel Claude Richard (died 1868), French botanist.
 August 24 – James Weddell (died 1834), Flemish-born Anglo-Scots seal hunter and Antarctic explorer.
 September 5 – François Sulpice Beudant (died 1850), French mineralogist et geologist.
 September 15 – Guillaume-Henri Dufour (died 1875), Swiss engineer et topographer.
 November 5 – John Richardson (died 1865), Scottish naturalist, explorer and surgeon.
 November 9 – Johann Natterer (died 1843), Austrian naturalist.
 November 18 – Louis Daguerre (died 1851), French inventor.
 December 17 – John Forbes (died 1861), Scottish physician
 December 17 (or 18) – Jan Evangelista Purkinje (died 1869), Czech anatomist et neurophysiologist.
 Undated – Pierre Charles Alexandre Louis (died 1872), French physician.

Deaths
 February 13 – Ruđer Bošković, Ragusan physicist, mathematician and astronomer (born 1711)
 May 10 – William Watson, English physician, botanist and physicist (born 1715)

References

 
18th century in science
1780s in science